The Professional Women's Bowling Association (PWBA) Tour expanded from 10 events in 2015 to 13 events in 2016, with one additional major (GoBowling.com PWBA Players Championship).  The season ran from April 29 to September 4. CBS Sports Network aired the final round of all PWBA Tour events this season on a tape-delay basis, except for majors which aired the final round live. TV tapings of the non-major stepladder finals were conducted in conjunction with first three major tournaments on May 26 (USBC Queens), June 26 (PWBA Players Championship) and August 7 (U.S. Women's Open).

The PBA Striking Against Breast Cancer Mixed Doubles, a cross-over event with the PBA Tour, returned for 2016. PBA and PWBA titles were awarded to the male and female winners, respectively, which meant 14 total PWBA titles were up for grabs in 2016.

Tournament summary

Below is a recap of events held during the 2016 PWBA Tour season. Major tournaments are in bold. Career PWBA title numbers for winners are shown in parenthesis (#).

C: broadcast on CBS Sports Network
X: broadcast on the PBA's Xtra Frame webcast service

External links
PWBA.com, home of the Professional Women' Bowling Association

2016 in bowling